Andapa is a town and commune in northern Madagascar. It belongs to the district of Andapa, which is a part of Sava Region. According to 2001 commune census the population of Andapa was 27,618.

Andapa is served by a local airport. It is also a site of industrial-scale  mining. The majority 88% of the population are farmers, while an additional 0.5% receives their livelihood from raising livestock. The most important crop is rice, while other important products are beans, tomatoes and vanilla.  Industry and services provide employment for 1.5% and 10% of the population, respectively.

Geography
The capital of the Sava Region, Sambava is at a distance of 108 km.

It is situated at the Lokoho River.

Nature
 Marojejy National Park
 The administration office of the Anjanaharibe-Sud Reserve is situated in Andapa. The reserve is at 25 km from this town.

References

External links
Informations about Andapa

Cities in Madagascar
Populated places in Sava Region